Richard Forman Reed (November 11, 1861 - May 31, 1926) was a state legislator and justice of the Supreme Court of Mississippi from 1912 to 1915.

Born in Jefferson County, Mississippi on November 11, 1861, Reed established his home in Natchez, Mississippi, where he entered the practice of law with his father in 1885. Reed represented Adams County, Mississippi, for one term in the Mississippi State Senate, where he unsuccessfully opposed a measure to transition to an elected judiciary. He was "regarded by many as perhaps the ablest lawyer in the Senate".

Reed was an unsuccessful candidate for the Republican nomination for a seat in the United States House of Representatives, but later that year was appointed by Governor Earl L. Brewer to a seat on the state supreme court vacated by the resignation of Chief Justice Robert Burns Mayes. In addition to his judicial service, Reed was known as a writer, having written a piece titled The Nature Country describing the settlement of Natchez. He lectured on law at Millsaps College.

Reed died at his home in Natchez.

References

1861 births
1926 deaths
People from Jefferson County, Mississippi
Mississippi state senators
Justices of the Mississippi Supreme Court
Millsaps College faculty